Hugh John MacDonald  (November 11, 1898 – March 2, 1965) was a Canadian provincial politician and judge from Alberta. He served as a member of the Legislative Assembly of Alberta from 1940 to 1944, sitting as a member of the anti-SC Unity League AKA Independent Citizens' Association for the constituency of Edmonton. MacDonald served on the Edmonton City Council for six years, and was a judge and lawyer.

Early life
Hugh John Macdonald was born in South Hanson, Massachusetts on November 11, 1898 to a Canadian father from Cape Breton. In his youth the family moved to Edmonton where he eventually studied at the University of Alberta earning a Bachelor of Arts in 1921 and Bachelor of Laws in 1923. Macdonald served in the United States Army during the First World War, and returned to Alberta where he served as the principal of the Banff public and high school from 1923 to 1927. After 1927, Macdonald returned to Edmonton to work as a solicitor for Wood, Buchanan & Macdonald, developing significant experience in insurance law.

Judicial career
Macdonald was appointed to the Trial Division of the Supreme Court of Alberta on October 20, 1944 and the Court of Appeal of Alberta on January 17, 1957.

Later life
Macdonald took a strong interest in the University of Alberta, serving on the Senate, Board of Governors, and as President of the Alumni Association.

References

1965 deaths
1898 births
Judges in Alberta
Independent Alberta MLAs
Edmonton city councillors
Canadian King's Counsel